James Congall MacBennett (16 November 1925 – 23 February 1995) was a footballer, who played as a winger in the Football League for Cardiff City and Tranmere Rovers.

References

Tranmere Rovers F.C. players
Cardiff City F.C. players
Margate F.C. players
Chelmsford City F.C. players
English Football League players
Association football wingers
Belfast Celtic F.C. players
1925 births
1995 deaths
Association footballers from Northern Ireland
People from County Down